Dermi Lusala (born 16 January 2003) is an English professional footballer who plays for  club Barwell as a right back, on loan from  club Coventry City. He is a product of the Tottenham Hotspur and Brentford academies and transferred to Coventry City in 2022. Lusala was capped by England at U16 level.

Club career

Youth years 
A right back, Lusala began his career in the Brentford Academy and was a part of the U13 team which won the 2016 Elite Neon Cup. Following the closure of the academy at the end of the 2015–16 season, Lusala transferred into the Tottenham Hotspur Academy. He progressed to sign a one-year professional contract at the end of the 2020–21 season. Following an injury-plagued season in the Development Squad, during which he participated in first team training sessions, Lusala was released when his contract expired.

Coventry City 
On 1 July 2022, Lusala signed a two-year contract with Championship club Coventry City on a free transfer. On 25 November 2022, he joined Southern League Premier Division Central club Barwell on a one-month loan.

International career 
Lusala was capped by England at U16 level.

Personal life 
Lusala attended St Ignatius' College.

Career statistics

References

External links 

 Dermi Lusala at ccfc.co.uk

Living people
English footballers
English Football League players
Association football fullbacks
2003 births
Black British sportspeople
Coventry City F.C. players
England youth international footballers
Barwell F.C. players
Southern Football League players